Abronica purpureoanulata is a species of sea slug, an aeolid nudibranch, a marine gastropod mollusc in the family Fionidae.

Distribution
This species was described from Seto Marine Biological Laboratory, Kii Peninsula and Tannowa, Osaka Bay, south coast of Honshu, Japan. It has also been reported from Hayama, Sagami Bay; Mukaishima, Seto Inland Sea; Awashima, Niigata Prefecture; Mera, Fukui Prefecture and Tsuruga Bay. As well as these localities in Japan it has been found in Hong Kong.

References 

Abronicidae
Gastropods described in 1961